Lise Christiane Renée-Legrand (born 4 September 1976 in Boulogne-sur-Mer) is a female French  wrestler who competed in the Women's Freestyle 63 kg at the 2004 Summer Olympics and won the bronze medal.

References

External links
 

1976 births
Living people
French female sport wrestlers
Olympic wrestlers of France
Wrestlers at the 2004 Summer Olympics
Wrestlers at the 2008 Summer Olympics
Olympic bronze medalists for France
Olympic medalists in wrestling

World Wrestling Championships medalists
Medalists at the 2004 Summer Olympics
Mediterranean Games gold medalists for France
Mediterranean Games medalists in wrestling
Competitors at the 2001 Mediterranean Games
21st-century French women